Republican Union may refer to:

Republican Union (France)
Republican Union (French Somaliland)
Republican Union (Portugal)
Republican Union (Puerto Rico)
Republican Union (Spain, 1886)
Republican Union Party (Spain)
Republican Union (Spain, 1934)

See also
 Popular Republican Union (disambiguation)
 Republican (disambiguation)
 Republic (disambiguation)
 Republicanism